Bronson Island is an uninhabited island in the Qikiqtaaluk Region, Nunavut, Canada. It is one of 24 islands that make up the Ottawa Islands, situated in the eastern portion of Hudson Bay.

Other islands in the vicinity include Booth Island, Gilmour Island, Perley Island, J. Gordon Island, Pattee Island, and Eddy Island.

References

Islands of Hudson Bay
Uninhabited islands of Qikiqtaaluk Region